Blue Collar Comedy Tour Rides Again is a 2004 American comedy film directed by C.B. Harding and starring Jeff Foxworthy, Bill Engvall, Larry the Cable Guy, Ron White, and PJ Walsh. It is a direct-to-video sequel to the film Blue Collar Comedy Tour: The Movie.

Plot  
The Blue Collar guys have reunited for their second tour, and in this movie, they are in Denver.

Bill Engvall was up first. His routine consisted of his critically acclaimed "Here's Your Sign" jokes, a hunting trip with his wife that went terribly wrong, and a whale-watching adventure in California with a couple of surfers.

Ron White, with his usual scotch on the rocks and cigar, took the stage next. His routine featured stories about his recent marriage to his second wife, an argument with a random bystander about Garth Brooks, and some material about the dogs that he owns, particularly his bulldog Sluggo.

Jeff Foxworthy came on to the stage after White. He gave his opinions of side effects in prescription medicines, shared similarities he noticed between straight men and gay men, as well as similarities between teenagers and senior citizens, with each portion involving a story about his redneck family.

Larry the Cable Guy came out to a rousing ovation from the audience. He delivered a routine which consisted of "family stories" and his many past relationships with various women.

After Larry finished his set, all the guys came out to close out the show. At first, they talked about how blessed they felt to do what they do, and with that, recalled the last jobs they had (or considered doing) before becoming comedians and eventually touring together. Then, Larry pulled out a guitar, and the guys performed the song "I Believe" to the enthusiastic Denver crowd.

External links 
 

Stand-up comedy concert films
Paramount Pictures films
2004 television films
2004 films
Country music films
2004 comedy films
2000s English-language films